The Order of the Smile (Polish: Order Uśmiechu) is an international award given by children to adults distinguished in their love, care and aid for children.

History

The idea of the Order of the Smile was established in 1968 by the Polish magazine Kurier Polski, inspired by Wanda Chotomska. In 1979 (announced by the UNESCO as the International Year of the Child) the Secretary-General of the United Nations Kurt Waldheim officially recognized the Order. From then, the Order of the Smile became an international order.

In 1996, in Rabka, the Order of the Smile Museum was established on the grounds of the family park known as "Rabkoland." After the region had been given the official status of the "City of Children from around the World," an initiative was put forward to open a permanent Polish Santa's Village, which would accept letters addressed to Santa Claus from children across Poland.

In 2003 an International Chapter of the Order of the Smile session took place outside the Warsaw headquarters in Świdnica, where the Child Friendship Center was being erected. Świdnica had been officially titled the "Capital of Children's Dreams," and September 21, 2003, was declared Order of the Smile Children's Day.

Design
Chotomska's television series Jacek i Agatka announced a competition to submit a design for the Order of the Smile. The award's logo was created and developed by a nine-year-old girl from Głuchołazy, Ewa Chrobak. Using a plate as a template, she drew a sun, and added uneven rays of light. The design, one of 45,000 that had been submitted, was chosen by Szymon Kobyliński, who elaborated it into its current form.

Nomination 
All candidates for the Order of Smile should be nominated by children. Nominations can come from a single child or collectively from many children. Nominations can be submitted from all around the world. The candidates should be people of extraordinary love and work for children. Nominations should be sent to the International Chapter of the Order of Smile (ICOS).  Afterwards the candidates are chosen to be Laureates by the Chapter.

The Order is awarded twice a year: in spring and in fall.  Laureates of the Order of Smile include now about 1000 people from almost 50 countries (state of April 2016).

Decorating
The medal - which is a badge representing a smiling sun - is awarded in Warsaw, Poland by the International Chapter of the Order of the Smile. There is a special procedure of the decoration. In special cases the decoration could be held outside Poland, in the country of the laureate. The right to use the title of the "Knight of the Order of Smile" is guaranteed only to those who were decorated at an official ceremony organized by the Chapter.

Traditionally, upon being awarded with the medal, each recipient must drink a glass or cup of lemon juice while smiling throughout the process.

International Chapter 
Although most of the 59 members of the Chapter are of Polish descent, it includes representatives from other countries such as Argentina, Armenia, Australia, Azerbaijan, Belarus, Belgium, Canada, the Czech Republic, Finland, France, Georgia, Germany, Hungary, Iran, Israel, Italy, Japan, Lithuania, Romania, Russia, Serbia, Sudan, Tunisia, Ukraine, the United Kingdom and the United States.

At the forefront of the International Chapter of the Order of Smile stands the Chancellor, Marek Michalak, who remains in this position since 19 January 2007. Previous Chancellors include: Ewa Szelburg-Zarembina (from 1968 to 1976), Radoslaw Ostrowicz (from 1982 to 1990), and Cezary Leżenski (from 1976 to 1981, and again from 1992 to 2006).

On 16 November 1992, the International Chapter of the Order of Smile was officially registered in Poland as an association.

Winners

Some notable Knights to receive the Order of the Smile include: 

 Abdullah of Saudi Arabia
 Bartosz Arłukowicz
 Tadeusz Balcerowski
 Agniya Barto
 Gerhard Behrendt
 Nina Bichuya
 Ewa Błaszczyk
 Wanda Błeńska
 Jakub Błaszczykowski
 Henryk Borowski
 Marek Borowski
 Assen Bossev
 Bohdan Butenko
 Czesław Centkiewicz
 Bernadette Chirac
 Henryk Chmielewski
 Wanda Chotomska
 Václav Čtvrtek
 Tibor Czorba
 14th Dalai Lama
 Wiktor Dega
 Janusz Dobrosz
 Anna Dymna
 Joni Eareckson Tada
 Joanna Fabisiak
 Krystyna Feldman
 Arkady Fiedler
 Benjamin Fiore, SJ
 Pope Francis
 Piotr Fronczewski
 Stanley H. Fryczynski Jr.
 Dora Gabe
 Janina Garścia
 Niki Goulandris
 Henryk Gulbinowicz
 Andrzej Gut-Mostowy
 Judit Halász
 Dagmar Havlová
 Zbigniew Herman
 Mirosław Hermaszewski
 Gavriil Ilizarov
 Tadeusz Isakowicz-Zaleski
 Stanisław Jankowski
 Alina Janowska
 Éva Janikovszky
 Tove Jansson
 Otylia Jędrzejczak
 Ignacy Jeż
 Majka Jeżowska
 Michał Józefczyk
 Pope John Paul II
 Irena Jurgielewiczowa
 Bogusław Kaczyński
 Eunice Kennedy Shriver
 Zygmunt Kęstowicz
 Ian Kiernan
 Hilary Koprowski
 Marek Kotański
 Maria Kownacka
 Vyacheslav Kotyonochkin
 Paweł Kukiz
 Dominika Kulczyk
 Jacek Kuroń
 Jolanta Kwaśniewska
 Aleksander Kwaśniewski
 Irena Kwiatkowska
 Henry Richardson Labouisse Jr.
 Zbigniew Lengren
 Astrid Lindgren
 Franciszek Macharski
 Halina Machulska
 Peter Maffay
 Ivan Malkovych
 Nelson Mandela
 Alina Margolis-Edelman
 Anđelka Martić
 Robert Mayer
 Marek Michalak
 Sergey Mikhalkov
 Leszek Miller
 Anna Mkapa
 Małgorzata Musierowicz
 Anne, Princess Royal
 Moza bint Nasser
 Władysław Nehrebecki
 Edmund Niziurski
 Józef Nowak
 Sergey Obraztsov
 Wiesław Ochman
 Janina Ochojska
 Jerzy Owsiak
 Hanna Ożogowska
 Ryszard Pacławski
 Stanisław Pagaczewski
 Farah Pahlavi
 Waldemar Pawlak
 Marek Plura
 Jerzy Przybylski
 Janusz Przymanowski
 Abdullah bin Abdulaziz Al Rabeeah
 Zbigniew Religa
 J. K. Rowling
 Viktar Shalkevich
 K. Shankar Pillai
 James Rutka
 Zbigniew Rychlicki
 Sue Ryder
 Ryszard Rynkowski
 Irena Santor
 Irena Sendler
 Queen Silvia of Sweden
 Sargent Shriver
 Stanisław Skalski
 Henryk Skarżyński
 Adam Słodowy
 Steven Spielberg
 Jerzy Stuhr
 Jan Szczepański
 Ewa Szelburg-Zarembina
 Alfred Szklarski
 Mother Teresa
 Jan Twardowski
 Eleni Tzoka
 Peter Ustinov
 Mariele Ventre
 Kurt Waldheim
 Oprah Winfrey 
 Maciej Wojtyszko
 Marian Woronin
 Sarah, Duchess of York
 Malala Yousafzai
 Rolf Zuckowski
 Wojciech Żukrowski

The youngest Knight to ever receive the Order of the Smile is Malala Yousafzai, who was awarded the order in 2016, then aged 19. The oldest was Irena Sendler in 2007, aged 97.

See also

References

4. Pagan, M. (1989, January 25). Helping children with sick hearts. The Record, pp. 49–49. .Retrieved 2022-3-25.

External links

 Official site of the Order of the Smile

International orders, decorations, and medals
Polish awards
Awards established in 1968
1968 establishments in Poland